Queensbury is an area of northwest London, England, in the southeast of the London Borough of Harrow on the boundary with the London Borough of Brent. The area is split between four postal districts: Harrow HA3, Stanmore HA7, Edgware HA8, and London NW9.

Geography and history
The Queensbury suburb was built by Percy Harold Edwards (1886-1937). The name was chosen in a newspaper competition he inaugurated. From 1916 Queensbury was the site of the Stag Lane Aerodrome.

The area around Queensbury Circle and Honeypot Lane is in the HA postcode area and the area south east of Queensbury tube station is in the NW postcode area. Queensbury tube station is on the Jubilee line. Queensbury neighbours the district of Kingsbury in the London Borough of Brent.

Queensbury tube station
The main focus of Queensbury is the area around the tube station. Queensbury did not exist as an area before the opening of the Stanmore branch as part of the Metropolitan line in 1932 (transferred to the Bakerloo line in 1939, and then the Jubilee line in 1979. The station opened on 16 December 1934. The name Queensbury was adopted for the tube station to match neighbouring Kingsbury and has no historical basis. It had been selected by way of a newspaper competition.

The parade of shops and houses built along with the station form a large crescent with a public green space in the centre.  The area was developed in the 1930s and the architecture reflects this.  Until May 2008 a roundabout in front of the station featured a prominent 1930s style mast bearing the London Underground emblem. The pavements and public space were redeveloped at that time losing some of the 1930s character.

The tube station, and its local surroundings and characters were cited in the song "Queensbury Station" by the Berlin-based punk-jazz band The Magoo Brothers on their album "Beyond Believable", released in 1988. The song was written by Paul Bonin and Melanie Hickford, who both grew up and lived in the area.

Other places

Queensbury Circle Parade is a roundabout and shops located north west of Queensbury Station, along Honeypot Lane.  Queensbury sub-post office is located here.

Demographics
Queensbury is made up of two wards of its namesake in both London boroughs of Brent and Harrow, with a total population of 29,150 as of 2015. The area has a high ethnic diversity; as shown in the 2011 Census, 72.9% of the population of Queensbury ward in Brent and 75% of Queensbury ward in Harrow were of minority background; the latter is the most diverse part of the borough of Harrow.

The census showed the largest ethnic group in the Queensbury ward of Harrow were Indians, who comprised 43.2% of the population. The next largest ethnic groups were Other Asian (14.7%) and White British people (13.3%).

In terms of religious affiliation, in 2011 the Queensbury ward was 42% Hindu, 28% Christian, and 14.3% Muslim.

Transport and locale

Nearby places
 Burnt Oak
 Colindale
 Edgware
 Kenton
 Kingsbury
 Stanmore
 The Hyde

Tube

Stations in the area are:

  (Jubilee line)

Buses

London Buses serving Queensbury are:

References

Areas of London
Districts of the London Borough of Harrow
Districts of the London Borough of Brent